Hertha, Berliner Sport-Club e. V., commonly known as Hertha BSC, and sometimes referred to as Hertha Berlin, Hertha BSC Berlin, or simply Hertha, is a German professional football club based in the locality of Westend of the borough of Charlottenburg-Wilmersdorf of Berlin. Hertha BSC plays in the Bundesliga, the top tier of German football. Hertha BSC was founded in 1892, and was a founding member of the German Football Association in Leipzig in 1900.

The team won the German championship in 1930 and 1931. Since 1963, Hertha's stadium has been the Olympiastadion. The club is known as Die Alte Dame in German, which translates to "The Old Lady". In 2002, the sports activities of the professional, amateur, and under-19 teams were separated into Hertha BSC GmbH & Co. KGaA.

History

Early years
The club was formed in 1892 as BFC Hertha 92, taking its name from a steamship with a blue and white smokestack; one of the four young men who founded the club had taken a day trip on this ship with his father. The name Hertha is a variation on Nerthus, referring to a fertility goddess from Germanic mythology.

Hertha performed consistently well on the field, including a win in the first Berlin championship final in 1905. In May 1910, Hertha won a friendly match against Southend United, which was considered significant at the time, as England was where the game originated and English clubs dominated the sport. However, their on-field success was not matched financially and in 1920 the staunchly working-class Hertha merged with the well-heeled club Berliner Sport-Club to form Hertha Berliner Sport-Club. The new team continued to enjoy considerable success in the Oberliga Berlin-Brandenburg, while also enduring a substantial measure of frustration. The team played its way to the German championship final in six consecutive seasons from 1926 to 1931, but was only able to win the title in 1930 and 1931 with BSC leaving to become an independent club again after the combined side's first championship. Notwithstanding, Hertha emerged as the Germany's second most successful team during the inter-war years.

Play under the Third Reich
German football was re-organized under the Third Reich in 1933 into 16 top-flight divisions, which saw Hertha playing in the Gauliga Berlin-Brandenburg. The club continued to enjoy success within their division, regularly finishing in the upper half of the table and capturing the divisional title in 1935, 1937 and 1944. It faded from prominence, however, unable to advance out of the early rounds of the national championship rounds. Politically, the club was overhauled under Hitler, with Hans Pfeifer, a Nazi party member, being installed as president.

Postwar play

After World War II, occupying Allied authorities banned most organizations in Germany, including sports and football clubs. Hertha was re-formed late in 1945 as SG Gesundbrunnen and resumed play in the Oberliga Berlin – Gruppe C. The 36 teams of the first season of the post-war Oberliga Berlin were reduced to just a dozen the next year, and the club found itself out of first division football and playing in the Amateurliga Berlin. By the end of 1949, it had re-claimed their identity as Hertha BSC and earned a return to the top-flight.

Tensions between the western Allies and the Soviets occupying various sectors of the city, and the developing Cold War, led to chaotic conditions for football in the capital. Hertha was banned from playing against East German teams in the 1949–50 season after taking on several players and a coach who had fled the Dresden club SG Friedrichstadt for West Berlin. A number of sides from the eastern half of the city were forced from the Oberliga Berlin to the newly established DDR-Liga beginning with the 1950–51 season.

Through the 1950s, an intense rivalry developed with Tennis Borussia Berlin. A proposal for a merger between the two clubs in 1958 was resoundingly rejected, with only three of the 266 members voting in favour.

Being a major Berlin side, Hertha had fans in the entirety of Berlin, but following the division of the city, supporters in East Berlin found it both difficult and dangerous to follow the team. In interviews with long-time supporter Helmut Klopfleisch, he described his difficulties as a supporter in East Berlin. Klopfleisch came from the district of Pankow and attending his first home match as a young boy in 1954 he became an instant supporter. He continued to attend home matches at the stadium, but with the construction of the Berlin Wall in 1961, this became impossible. Despite this, he did not give up. By this time, Hertha played at the Stadion am Gesundbrunnen, nicknamed Die Plumpe. The stadium was located close enough to the Berlin wall for the sounds from the stadium to be heard over the wall. Thus, Klopfleisch and other supporters gathered behind the wall to listen to the home matches. When the crowd at the stadium cheered, Klopfleisch and the others cheered as well. Klopfleisch later came under suspicion by Stasi, the East German secret police. He was arrested and interrogated at numerous occasions. He also had his passport confiscated and eventually lost his job as an electrician.

Entry to the Bundesliga
At the time of the formation of the Bundesliga in 1963, Hertha was Berlin's reigning champion and so became an inaugural member of the new professional national league. In spite of finishing clear of the relegation zone, the team was demoted after the 1964–65 season following attempts to bribe players to play in the city under what had become decidedly unpleasant circumstances after the erection of the Berlin Wall. This caused something of a crisis for the Bundesliga which wanted, for political reasons, to continue to have a team in its ranks representing the former capital. Through various machinations, this led to the promotion of SC Tasmania 1900 Berlin, which then delivered the worst-ever performance in Bundesliga history. Hertha managed a return to the premier German league in 1968–69 and developed a solid following, making it Berlin's favourite side.

Hertha, however, was again soon touched by scandal through its involvement with several other clubs in the Bundesliga matchfixing scandal of 1971. In the course of an investigation of Hertha's role, it was also revealed that the club was 6 million DM in debt. Financial disaster was averted through the sale of the team's former home ground.

In spite of this, the team continued to enjoy a fair measure of success on the field through the 1970s with a second place Bundesliga finish behind Borussia Mönchengladbach in 1974–75, a semi-final appearance in the 1978–79 UEFA Cup, and two appearances in the final of the DFB-Pokal (1977 and 1979). The following season saw the fortunes of the team take a turn for the worse as it was relegated to the 2. Bundesliga, where it would spend 13 of the next 17 seasons.

Plans in 1982 for a merger with Tennis Borussia Berlin, SpVgg Blau-Weiß 1890 Berlin and SCC Berlin to form a side derisively referred to as "FC Utopia" never came to fruition. Hertha slipped as low as the third tier Amateur Oberliga Berlin, where it spent two seasons (1986–87 and 1987–88). Two turns in the Bundesliga (1982–83 and 1990–91) saw the team immediately relegated after poor performances. Hertha's amateur side enjoyed a greater measure of success, advancing all the way to the final of the DFB-Pokal in 1993, where its run ended in a close 0–1 defeat at the hands of Bundesliga side Bayer Leverkusen.

Following the fall of the Berlin Wall, Hertha became a popular side in East Berlin as well. Two days after the wall came down, 11,000 East Berliners attended Hertha's match against SG Wattenscheid. A fan friendship with Union Berlin developed, and a friendly match between the two attracted over 50,000 spectators.

Financial woes once more burdened the club in 1994, as it found itself 10 million DM in debt. The crisis was again resolved through the sale of real estate holdings in addition to the signing of a new sponsor and management team. By 1997, Hertha found its way back to the Bundesliga, where it generally managed to finish in the upper-third of the league table. When Hertha was promoted in 1997, it ended Berlin's six-year-long drought without a Bundesliga side, which had made the Bundesliga the only top league in Europe without representation from its country's biggest city and capital.

A period of oscillation

Most recently, bright spots for the side have been a continuous string of appearances in international play in the UEFA Cup and the UEFA Champions League beginning in the 1999 season, and the signing of key players such as Pál Dárdai in 1997 who became Herta's most capped player ever, Sebastian Deisler in 1999 and Brazilian international Marcelinho in 2001, who was named the Bundesliga's Player of the Year in 2005. Hertha has also invested heavily in its own youth football academy, which has produced several players with Bundesliga potential.

The team was almost relegated in the 2003–04 season, but rebounded and finished fourth the following season, but missed out on the Champions League after they were held to a draw on the final day by Hannover 96, which saw Werder Bremen overtake them for the spot on the final league matchday. (As a "thank-you" gesture, Werder sent the Hannover squad 96 bottles of champagne.) In 2005–06, the Herthaner finished in sixth position, then qualified for the UEFA Cup after defeating FC Moscow in the UEFA Intertoto Cup. However, Hertha was eliminated in the first round of the UEFA Cup by Odense BK. In 2006–07, Hertha finished tenth after sacking manager Falko Götz on 11 April. Hertha started the 2007–08 season with new manager Lucien Favre, who had won the Swiss championship in 2006 and 2007 with Zürich. Hertha finished tenth again, but started in the first qualification round of the UEFA Cup via the UEFA Respect Fair Play ranking, making it as far as the group stage of the tournament. After a successful campaign in 2008–09 season, finishing in fourth place and remaining in the title race up until the second to last matchday, the club had a very poor season in 2009–10 season, finishing last in the Bundesliga and suffering relegation.

After spending the 2010–11 season in the 2. Bundesliga, Hertha secured its return to the Bundesliga for 2011–12 by winning 1–0 at MSV Duisburg with three matchdays to play in the season. Hertha, however, finished 16th in the 2011–12 Bundesliga and lost in the relegation playoff to Fortuna Düsseldorf to fall back to the 2. Bundesliga.

In 2012–13, Hertha achieved promotion from the second division as champions for the second time in three seasons. On the opening day of the 2013–14 season, the club beat Eintracht Frankfurt 6–1 at the Olympiastadion to top the Bundesliga table at the end of matchday 1.

On 5 February 2015 Pál Dárdai, Hertha's longest serving and most capped player ever with 366 appearances took over as the manager of the main squad. At the halfway point of the 2015–16 Bundesliga season, Hertha lay in third place, its highest position at the winter break since 2008–09. Despite a late-season slump, Hertha still finished in seventh place for the season, its highest finish in the Bundesliga since 2008–09 during which Hertha finished fourth. The seventh-place finish meant the club secured Europa League football for the 2016–17 season by the means of a third round play-off. Hertha lost the third round play-off 3–2 on aggregate to Brøndby, winning the first leg 1–0 in Berlin but losing the second away tie 3–1, with Teemu Pukki scoring a hat-trick for the Danish side.

In the 2016–17 Bundesliga season, Hertha enjoyed its best ever start to a Bundesliga season in terms of points won during the opening eight matches, losing just one match – away against Bayern Munich – and forcing a draw away against Borussia Dortmund. At the 2016–17 Bundesliga winter break, Hertha stood at third place in the league, with nine wins, three draws and four losses. Hertha finished the season on 6th place and qualified for the 2017–18 Europa League. Their place in the group stage was secured on 27 May 2017, after Borussia Dortmund defeated Eintracht Frankfurt in the 2017 DFB–Pokal final.

Lars Windhorst's era
In June 2019, Lars Windhorst bought a stake in the club.

On 27 November 2019, Jürgen Klinsmann became the new manager of Hertha BSC, replacing Ante Čović. Klinsmann left the club on 11 February 2020, after only 76 days in charge. Assistant manager Alexander Nouri took interim charge of the team, before the permanent appointment of Bruno Labbadia on 9 April 2020.

In 2020, Lars Windhorst bought an increased stake in the club.

Stadium

Since 1963, Hertha BSC has played its matches in Berlin's Olympiastadion, originally built for the 1936 Summer Olympics.

The stadium has a permanent capacity of 74,649 seats, making it the largest stadium in Germany in terms of seating capacity and the second largest stadium in Germany, behind the Signal Iduna Park in Dortmund, in terms of total capacity. For certain football matches, such as those against Bayern Munich, the capacity can be temporarily expanded. This is made by the addition of mobile grandstand over the Marathon Arch. The extended capacity reached 76,197 seats in 2014.

The stadium underwent major renovations twice, in 1974 and from 2000 to 2004. In both cases, the renovations were for the upcoming FIFA World Cup. In the 1974 upgrades, the stadium received a partial roof. It underwent a thorough modernization for the 2006 World Cup. In addition, the colour of the track was changed to blue to match Hertha's club colours. In addition to Hertha's home games, Olympiastadion serves as one of the home grounds for the Germany national football team, and it hosts concerts, track and field competitions, and the annual DFB-Pokal final. It was also the site for six matches of the 2006 World Cup, including the tournament final.

Hertha played its matches on a sports field on the "Exer" on Schönhauser Allee in Prenzlauer Berg until 1904. This was the first home ground of Hertha. The Exer was a former parade ground of the 1st (Emperor Alexander) Guards Grenadiers and the site is today occupied by the Friedrich-Ludwig-Jahn-Sportpark. Hertha then moved it matches to the Schebera-Sportplatz in the locality of Gesundbrunnen in 1904. The Stadion am Gesundbrunnen was built in the area in 1923. The stadium would be nicknamed "Die Plumpe" and had a capacity of 35,000, of which 3,600 seated. Hertha left the stadium when it joined the Bundesliga in 1963. Hertha returned to the site during the Regionalliga years from 1965 to 1968. The sale of the site in 1971 helped the club avoid bankruptcy.

Due to a lack of spectator interest, Hertha played its 2. Bundesliga and Amateurliga matches from 1986 to 1989 at the Poststadion. The opening fixtures of the 1992–93 season, as well as the Intertoto Cup and UEFA Cup qualifying matches, were played at the Friedrich-Ludwig-Jahn-Sportpark.

It was confirmed on 23 May 2016 that Hertha will continue to play its home matches at the Olympiastadion until 2025.

New stadium
On 30 March 2017, Hertha announced its intentions to build a new 55,000 seater stadium, to be ready in 2025 when their contract to play at the Olympiastadion runs out. The club noted many factors for this decision, one being that the Berlin side are the only club in the Bundesliga without a dedicated football stadium. In the announcement, the club acknowledged that the Olympiastadion was suitable for major national and international matches, but was too large for the average attendance of a Hertha home game, with only 64% seats being sold; opposed to the Bundesliga average of 92%. On the announcement, the club stated that its preferred option was to construct its own stadium, with a survey identifying a suitable site in Berlin's Olympic Park close to the Olympiastadion. But, at the same time, Berlin's state government indicated a willingness to consider rebuilding the Olympiastadion itself into a football-only venue. However, following the success of the 2018 European Athletics Championships held at the stadium, combined with the potential cost of the conversion, the state government subsequently elected not to proceed, leading Hertha to return to the Olympic Park proposal. However, if that plan was rejected, they also have secondary plans for the stadium to be built in Brandenburg Park, Ludwigsfelde.

Players

Current squad

Players out on loan

Hertha BSC II

Player records

Most Bundesliga/2. Bundesliga appearances – 366;  Pál Dárdai
Most Bundesliga goals scored – 93;  Michael Preetz

"Squad of the Century"
For the club's 111th birthday, Hertha fans elected the "Squad of the Century".

Current staff

Coaches

Honours

Domestic
 German Champions:
 Winners: 1930, 1931
 Runners-up: 1926, 1927, 1928, 1929, 1974–75
 2. Bundesliga:
 Winners: 1989–90, 2010–11, 2012–13
 Runners-up: 1981–82
 DFB-Ligapokal:
 Winners: 2001, 2002
 Runners-up: 2000
 DFB-Pokal:
 Runners-up: 1976–77, 1978–79, 1992–93 1

Note 1: Reserve Team

International
 UEFA Cup:
 Semi-finals: 1978–79

Regional
 Berlin/Brandenburg Champions (−1933):
 Winners (12): 1906, 1915, 1917, 1918, 1925, 1926, 1927, 1928, 1929, 1930, 1931, 1933
 Runners-up: 1914, 1916
 Gauliga Berlin-Brandenburg:
 Winners: 1935, 1937, 1944
 Runners-up: 1934, 1938, 1939, 1941
 Oberliga Berlin (1945–63):
 Winners: 1957, 1961, 1963
 Runners-up: 1960, 1962
 Regionalliga Berlin: (II)
 Winners: 1966, 1967, 1968
 Amateur-Oberliga Berlin: (III)
 Winners: 1949, 1987, 1988
 Runners-up: 1954 
 Berlin Cup: (Tiers III-VII)
 Winners (13): 1920, 1924, 1928, 1929, 1943, 1958, 1959, 1966, 1967, 1976, 1987, 1992, 2004
 Runners-up: 2006

Youth
 German Under 19 Championship
 Winners: 2018
 German Under 17 Championship
 Winners: 2000, 2003, 2005, 2012
 Runners-up: 1991
 Under 19 Bundesliga North/Northeast
 Winners: 2005, 2006, 2018
 Runners-up: 2003, 2004, 2012, 2017
 Under 17 Bundesliga North/Northeast
 Winners: 2008, 2010, 2012, 2013, 2020
 Runners-up: 2011, 2014, 2018 2019
 Under 19 DFB-Pokal (de)
 Winners: 2004, 2015
 Runners-up: 2010, 2012, 2016
 Under 17 NOFV-Pokal (de)
 Winners: (4) 2001, 2008, 2012, 2014 (Record)

Statistics

In European football

Accurate as of 10 December 2017

Women's football
Missing out on a trend of promoting women's football, Hertha became one of a decreasing number of major German football clubs left outside the top of women's football. Several steps had been taken to develop women's football, but most of them ended up inconclusive. The change came in 2009, when the club announced that it was to launch a cooperation in women's football with 1. FC Lübars, a football club from the Berlin borough Reinickendorf and with decades of history in women's football.

From one side, the partnership meant that Hertha was to provide Lübars with various forms of support, including financial support, expertise in licensing and sponsor acquisition, equipment and training instruction – investing approximately 1 million Euros in the project. From the other side, the partnership meant that Lübars was to compete in the colours of Hertha, thus earning the nickname "Die Hertha-Frauen" ("The Hertha-women"). In the long run, the club plans for the team of 1. FC Lübars to be integrated with Hertha BSC. 1. FC Lübars now competes in the 2. Bundesliga of women's football.

References

External links

Hertha BSC statistics
Hertha BSC formations at football-lineups

 
Association football clubs established in 1892
Berlin Hertha
Hertha
1892 establishments in Germany
Bundesliga clubs
2. Bundesliga clubs